Paschim Bainan is a census town in Bagnan I CD Block in Howrah district  in the state of West Bengal, in eastern India.

References

Cities and towns in Howrah district